Seriatopora guttata is a species of colonial stony coral in the family Pocilloporidae. It is native to the western Indo-Pacific region, its range extending from Madagascar and the Indian Ocean to the central Indo-Pacific, Australia, Indonesia and the south China Sea. It is a common species and the International Union for Conservation of Nature has assessed its conservation status as being of "least concern".

References

Pocilloporidae
Animals described in 2000
Taxobox binomials not recognized by IUCN